Richard of Campsall (Ricardus de Campsalle) (c.1280-c.1350) was an English theologian and scholastic philosopher, at the University of Oxford. He was a Fellow of Balliol College and then of Merton College. He is now considered a possible precursor to the views usually associated with William of Ockham.

He commented on Aristotle's Prior Analytics, with emphasis on "conversion" and "consequences". He is an apparent innovator in speculation about God's foreknowledge, particularly concerning future contingents, around 1317.

References

 Edward A. Synan (ed.), The Works of Richard of Campsall, Toronto: Pontifical institute of mediaeval studies, 1982.

Notes

14th-century English people
English theologians
Scholastic philosophers
Fellows of Balliol College, Oxford
Fellows of Merton College, Oxford
14th-century philosophers